Jessica Plazas (born 26 March 2002) is a Colombian beach tennis and former tennis player.

Plazas has a career-high ITF junior ranking of 345, achieved on 9 April 2018.

She made her WTA Tour main-draw debut at the 2018 Copa Colsanitas in the doubles draw, partnering Camila Osorio. She was given a wildcard to the main draw at the 2021 edition. Her last match on the pro tour before she changed for beach tennis was in March 2022.

External links
 
 

2002 births
Living people
Colombian female tennis players
21st-century Colombian women